Hydrocharis is a genus of aquatic plants in the family Hydrocharitaceae described as a genus by Carl Linnaeus in 1753. It is widespread across much of Europe and Asia, plus a few scattered locations in Africa. It is also reportedly naturalized in parts of North America.

The best known species is Hydrocharis morsus-ranae, commonly called common frogbit or European frog's-bit, and occasionally water-poppy. The name "American frogbit" refers to another aquatic plant, Limnobium spongia.

Three species are recognised:
Hydrocharis chevalieri (De Wild.) Dandy – Benin, Cameroon, Gabon, Central African Republic, Republic of the Congo, Democratic Republic of the Congo
Hydrocharis dubia (Blume) Backer – Primorsky Krai, China, Japan, Korea, Indian subcontinent, SE Asia, New Guinea
Hydrocharis morsus-ranae L. – Europe, Siberia, North Africa, Turkey, Caucasus, Kazakhstan

References

External links

Hydrocharitaceae
Hydrocharitaceae genera
Aquatic plants